The Lincoln Hunters is a 1958 science fiction novel by American writer Wilson Tucker.

Plot
The novel, set in the year 2578, details the story of a historian from the oppressive society of that year, who travels back in time to record Abraham Lincoln's Lost Speech of May 19, 1856, in Bloomington, Illinois.

It contains a vivid description of Lincoln in the early stages of his career, seen through the eyes of a future American who feels that Lincoln and his time compare very favorably with the traveler's own.

Legacy
The book is mentioned in 11/22/63, a novel by Stephen King that also centers around time travel and an assassinated president. Furthermore, King's protagonist time travels to 1958—the year "Hunters" was published—to alter the timeline by 1963.

References 

1958 American novels
1958 science fiction novels
American science fiction novels
Novels about time travel
Novels by Wilson Tucker
Fiction set in 1856
Novels set in Illinois
Fiction set in the 26th century
Fictional depictions of Abraham Lincoln in literature